El Salvador competed at the 2004 Summer Olympics in Athens, Greece, from 13 to 29 August 2004. This was the nation's eighth appearance at the Olympics.

Comité Olímpico de El Salvador sent a total of 7 athletes to the Games, 2 men and 5 women, to compete in 6 sports. Cyclist Evelyn García was chosen to carry her nation's flag during the opening ceremony.

Competitors 
Comité Olímpico de El Salvador selected a team of 7 athletes, 2 men and 5 women, to compete in 6 sports. Long-distance runner Elizabeth Zaragoza, at age 35, was the oldest athlete of the team, while runner Takeshi Fujiwara was the youngest at age 19. 

The following is the list of number of competitors participating in the Games.

Archery

El Salvador qualified one participant in men's individual archery.

Athletics 

Salvadoran athletes achieved qualifying standards in the following athletics events (up to a maximum of 3 athletes in each event at the 'A' Standard, and 1 at the 'B' Standard). 

Men

Women

Cycling

Road

Track
Pursuit

Shooting 

Women

Swimming 

Women

Weightlifting

See also
El Salvador at the 2003 Pan American Games
El Salvador at the 2004 Summer Paralympics

References

External links
Official Report of the XXVIII Olympiad

Nations at the 2004 Summer Olympics
2004
Summer Olympics